Montauk County Park, formerly known as Theodore Roosevelt County Park, is located approximately  east of Montauk, New York.

Montauk County Park was created from 1971 to 1986 through a series of land acquisitions by Suffolk County with the help of Hilda Lindley and the Concerned Citizens of Montauk. It was named for Theodore Roosevelt in 1998 to commemorate the centennial anniversary of his return to Long Island following the Spanish–American War, however it was renamed "Montauk County Park" in 2014 after concerns were raised about the insignificance of Roosevelt's actual involvement with the area.

The park includes:
 Big Reed Pond – a National Natural Landmark.
 Montaukett Village – a home and burial ground of the Montaukett tribe of Native Americans, which includes the grave of member Stephen Talkhouse
 Deep Hollow Ranch – the first cattle ranch in the United States, established in 1658
 Third House – the third residence constructed in the 18th century for cattle keepers, who brought cattle to graze in Montauk each summer. The house is open seasonally.
 Camp Wikoff – where Theodore Roosevelt and his Rough Riders were temporarily quarantined after returning from the Spanish–American War in 1898

Big Reed Pond 

Big Reed Pond was designated as a registered National Natural Landmark in 1973. Its ecosystem is at the confluence between fresh water and brackish water, as the pond is fresh water but some of the wetlands that border it are brackish.  The local sandy soil and high rates of precipitation create a fragile homeostatic balance between fresh water and saltwater.  The maintenance of the County Park as open space helps to maintain this balance.

Montaukett Village 

The Montaukett tribe originally occupied this area of Long Island.  In the late 17th century Chief Wyandanch gave much of the South Fork of Long Island to Lion Gardiner. The remaining Montauk were still living in the area until the Montauk peninsula was purchased by Arthur Bensen in 1879.  The ruins of a sweat lodge and part of the village are still visible.  The Pharaoh Museum is located in a small cabin near Third House and contains displays of the tools and pottery used by the Montaukett.  Stephen Talkhouse, whose round trip walks of  inspired the Paumanok Path, is buried in the cemetery.

Deep Hollow Ranch 

Deep Hollow Ranch claims to be the birthplace of the American cowboy, as it was founded as a cattle ranch in 1658. It has been operating continuously ever since; in the 21st century it offers horseback riding and hay rides.

From 1990 through 1999, Deep Hollow Ranch was the site of several "Back at the Ranch" concerts to raise funds for local charities. Most of the events were produced with the help of singer–songwriter Paul Simon, who owns a home near the ranch. The summer concerts had performers including The Allman Brothers Band, Edie Brickell, James Brown, Jimmy Buffett, The Cars, Ray Charles, Foreigner, Don Henley, The Highwaymen, Billy Joel, Lyle Lovett, Paul Simon and James Taylor, drawing as many as 10,000 attendees to each event.

Third House 

Running from west to east, First House, Second House and Third House were the first residences constructed on the eastern tip of Long Island after the keeper's quarters at Montauk Point Lighthouse. They were built in the 18th century for the cattle keepers who drove horses, sheep, and cattle to graze in Montauk each year from May through November.

First House was located near what is now Hither Hills State Park in Napeague and no longer exists. Second House is located at the west end of Montauk village and is now operated as a museum. Third House is used as the headquarters of Deep Hollow Ranch. In 1879 Arthur Bensen bought virtually all of the land on the eastern end from Napeague to Montauk Point. The purchase was intended to force the Montaukett off the land. Benson made Third House his residence, hoping to develop the area as a summer resort following Austin Corbin's extension of the Long Island Rail Road to Montauk.

Camp Wikoff 

Benson failed to realize his plans. He sold much of the land to the federal government for Army, Navy, and eventually Air Force, bases.

It was named for Col. Charles A. Wikoff of the 22nd U.S. Infantry, who was killed in the San Juan Heights assaults of the Spanish–American War.

During World War II, sections of Camp Wikoff were developed for massive gun emplacements and concrete observation bunkers as part of the New York coastal defense.  During the Cold War, a large radar tower was built at the Camp Hero section. Later the camp was abandoned by the military and sectioned off in three state parks.

Three state parks that include portions of the federal military complex and its infrastructure have been established:
 Montauk Point State Park
 Camp Hero State Park
 Shadmoor State Park
Other portions of the camp were sold to private developers.

Third House, formerly Camp Wikoff headquarters, now serves as the park headquarters. It contains a Spanish–American War exhibit with photo and memorabilia from the war and Roosevelt's disbanding of the Rough Riders.  Camp Wikoff is open to the public May through October.

See also
 Hendrick van der Heul
Hilda Lindley House

References

External links 
 
 Montauk County Park – Suffolk County Park site (Page not found as of June 24, 2017)
 History of Camp Wikoff, Spanish–American War
 Deep Hollow Ranch, Official website
 Theodore Roosevelt Heritage Trail, Heritage New York
 Montauk Bunker (Bygone Long Island)

East Hampton (town), New York
Camp Wikoff (Montauk)
Museums in Suffolk County, New York
Military and war museums in New York (state)
Historic house museums in New York (state)
Native American museums in New York (state)
Farm museums in New York (state)
Parks in Suffolk County, New York